Wyndmoor is a census-designated place (CDP) in Springfield Township, Montgomery County, Pennsylvania, United States. The population was 5,498 at the 2010 census. Wyndmoor has the same ZIP code, 19038, as the towns of Glenside, North Hills, and Erdenheim.

Geography
Wyndmoor is located at  (40.082810, −75.191829), which is just outside the northern boundary of Philadelphia.

Demographics

As of the 2010 census, the CDP was 73.5% Non-Hispanic White, 18.8% Black or African American, 0.2% Native American and Alaskan Native, 3.3% Asian, 0.7% were Some Other Race, and 1.9% were two or more races. 2.5% of the population were of Hispanic or Latino ancestry.

As of the census of 2000, there were 5,601 people, 2,144 households, and 1,460 families residing in the CDP. The population density was 3,392.0 people per square mile (1,310.6/km2). There were 2,191 housing units at an average density of 1,326.9/sq mi (512.7/km2). The racial makeup of the CDP was 80.70% White, 15.62% African American, 0.20% Native American, 2.12% Asian, 0.34% from other races, and 1.02% from two or more races. Hispanic or Latino of any race were 1.05% of the population.

There were 2,144 households, out of which 29.0% had children under the age of 18 living with them, 56.3% were married couples living together, 9.4% had a female householder with no husband present, and 31.9% were non-families. 27.5% of all households were made up of individuals, and 14.0% had someone living alone who was 65 years of age or older. The average household size was 2.39 and the average family size was 2.93.

In the CDP, the population was spread out, with 20.3% under the age of 18, 4.1% from 18 to 24, 23.5% from 25 to 44, 25.6% from 45 to 64, and 26.6% who were 65 years of age or older. The median age was 46 years. For every 100 females, there were 81.4 males. For every 100 females age 18 and over, there were 75.4 males.

The median income for a household in the CDP was $72,219, and the median income for a family was $81,377. Males had a median income of $56,392 versus $47,292 for females. The per capita income for the CDP was $36,205. About 0.8% of families and 2.3% of the population were below the poverty line, including 0.6% of those under age 18 and 5.2% of those age 65 or over.

Transportation
Wyndmoor is served by SEPTA's Wyndmoor train station, which is actually  in the nearby Chestnut Hill neighborhood of Philadelphia.

History

William Penn, the founder of Pennsylvania, reserved Springfield Township as one of his family's original manors in the 1680s.

The origin of the name "Wyndmoor" is somewhat obscure. The community was earlier called "Bungtown," "Spring (or Springfield) Village," and "Tedyuscung," after the Native American leader, Teedyuscung, whose statue stands overlooking the Wissahickon Creek in Valley Green.  "Wyndmoor" is variously said to be an appellation offered by the Heebner family who donated land for the Reading Railroad station, or originally the name of the estate of Randal Morgan, who made a fortune in oil and purchased property adjacent to the Reading Railroad station about 1900. The name eventually replaced the name "Springfield Village" for the small collection of shops and houses just east of Stenton Avenue, and finally encompassed the entire residential area east of Stenton Avenue.

Wyndmoor was the site of Whitemarsh Hall, the  estate of banking executive Edward T. Stotesbury. The estate became a housing development in the late 1940s, and the 147-room mansion was demolished in 1980, but the columns of its portico and pieces of statuary survive in the neighborhoods of Wyndmoor.

The Stotesbury Club House and John Welsh House are listed on the National Register of Historic Places.

Wyndmoor Hose Company

Wyndmoor Hose Company No. 1 was formed in 1906 and chartered in 1907. The seeds of the local fire company grew out of an industrial base at Mermaid Lane and Queen Street. There, the Nelson Valve Company began an in-house fire brigade to meet the needs of the dangerous industrial mechanisms used to make hydraulic valves. Eventually, the local community was solicited for its help in keeping this fire unit viable and expanding its services to the larger community. Residents volunteered, recognizing the communal benefit, and with help from the valve company a two-wheeled hand cart was purchased and 500 feet of hose. By 1909, the shed used at the valve Company was expanded, as were the hose carts to four wheels and two horses. Horse power proved a problem. A monetary reward was granted to the first horse team to arrive at the sound of the alarm and haul the apparatus to the scene. This actually produced a rivalry among horse teams!

At the dawn of the Roaring Twenties the fire company got a new home, on Queen Street closer to Willow Grove Ave. It still stands and served as a firehouse for nearly 50 years. In 1927, Wyndmoor purchased two Hale Pumpers and in 1940 a city service ladder truck. As the nations infant automotive industry diversified and began to specialize, communities began purchasing recognizable fire apparatus. A huge property along Willow Grove Ave. was purchased by the fire company, and large fairs were held for a dozen years. The proceeds from these carnivals offset astronomical costs and allowed the continued modernization of the fire service in Wyndmoor.

Wyndmoor Hose Company is a 100% volunteer department. The fifty-plus members who make up the working force are notified by digital paging systems, day and night, 24 hours a day, 7 days a week, 365 days a year.

Beyond fire suppression activities, WHCo is active in the community in many other ways. Fire prevention programs have always been a primary focus. The company keeps a busy schedule with weekend birthday parties held at the station, sometimes multiple parties each day. The parties often include a 15–30-minute presentation on fire safety. Throughout the year WHCo presents fire prevention programs to local schools, camps, day-care facilities, and other businesses and organizations. Annual demonstrations are made to The Boy Scouts of America to display not only safety messages, but also drunk-driving warnings.

Equally importantly, WHCo has forged a relationship, approaching almost a decade long, with UCP – United Cerebral Palsy. UCP is a nearby organization who provides direct services to over 2,400 adults, children and their families with a variety of disabilities including cerebral palsy, head trauma, stroke and spinal cord injury. Groups of Wyndmoor firefighters can be found at any one of UCP's six annual fundraising events.

Monday nights are busy nights for Wyndmoor volunteers. Almost fifty weeks a year, Wyndmoor firefighters meet Mondays from 6:45 pm through 9:30 pm to maintain, test, practice, discuss, and plan for fire and rescue-related events. Beyond these evenings, special joint training sessions might be scheduled for weekends or other evenings throughout the year. While all firefighters must engage in no less than eighty hours of academy training before stepping foot on a fireground, the reality holds true that the training never ends. 

In the late 1990s it was decided that the fire company would add emergency medical services to its already expanded list of rescue operations. The company purchased the QRS (Quick Response Service) unit that houses enough basic life support and first-aid equipment to complement the Springfield Ambulance Association's arrival.

Shortly after WHCo sent a crew to Ground Zero following September 11, 2001's terrorist activities, the Hazardous Materials operation also expanded. Wyndmoor teamed with HazMat 919 as Eastern Montgomery County's primary decontamination service. A larger environmental response trailer was purchased to accommodate the increased quantity of equipment needed. A much more in-depth training program was enforced and all WHCo members were required to complete advanced levels of hazardous materials training.

Today Wyndmoor Hose Company, No. 1 is equipped to respond to virtually any emergency. Currently the department responds with a 2007 Pierce Rescue, a Ford F550, has a boat used for rescue, and trailers. A '19 Rosenbauer with a 55' aerial boom was received May 2019 - Snorkel 82. From building fire to vehicle rescue, from hazardous material to emergency medical situations, Wyndmoor has personnel that are well trained and highly skilled prepared to act.

Educational institutions
La Salle College High School
The Institutes for the Achievement of Human Potential (IAHP)

Notable people
Notable current and former residents of Wyndmoor include:
 Samuel L. M. Barlow (1892–1982),  was a Harvard-educated  composer, pianist and art critic.
 Ray Benson (March 16, 1951 - ), country music star, cofounder of Asleep at the Wheel.
 Jim Cramer (February 10, 1955-), CNBC host of Mad Money
 Steven Kampmann (born 1947), actor, writer, and director.
 Robert L. McNeil, Jr. (1915–2010), developer of Tylenol and chairman of McNeil Laboratories
 David Montgomery (1946-2019), was the part-owner, general partner, president, and chief executive officer of the Philadelphia Phillies.
 Otto Frederick Nolde (1899–1972), was a human rights pioneer
 Lucky Oceans (April 21, 1951 - ), pedal steel guitarist and cofounder of Asleep at the Wheel, later a broadcaster with the Australian Broadcasting Corporation.
 Edward T. Stotesbury (February 26, 1849 – May 16, 1938), was an investment banker, a partner in Drexel & Co. and its New York affiliate J. P. Morgan & Co. for over 55 years.

References

External links
 Wyndmoor Hose Company, No. 1

Census-designated places in Montgomery County, Pennsylvania
Census-designated places in Pennsylvania